Arnold Wilfred Schmautz (July 3, 1933 – September 13, 2016) was a Canadian professional hockey player who played 934 games in the Western Hockey League, spending time with the New Westminster Royals, Victoria Cougars, and Portland Buckaroos.

External links
 

1933 births
2016 deaths
People from Ituna
Ice hockey people from Saskatchewan
New Westminster Royals (WHL) players
Portland Buckaroos players
Canadian ice hockey right wingers